Sokos Hotel Viru is a hotel in Tallinn, Estonia. Originally owned by Intourist and called Viru Hotel, it was first opened on 5 May 1972. The hotel building was the first high-rise building in Estonia. Today, the hotel is connected to the shopping centre, Viru Keskus, and is owned by Sokos Hotels.

The Soviet Union gave the project of Viru Hotel to the construction company Repo Oy from Savonlinna, Finland in 1969 and construction of the hotel started in July. However, the company went bankrupt in the middle of construction after a fire broke out on the 10th floor of the hotel in December 1969. The state of Finland had to maintain its relations with the Soviet Union, and find another construction company and financial backing for the project. The Finnish company Haka Oy finished the hotel in May 1972. The project resulted in a new construction project in Pääjärvi that same year, and later new construction projects in Enso and Kostamus (all these being in the Republic of Karelia).

During the Soviet era, the 23rd floor of the hotel housed a KGB radio centre, used to eavesdrop and spy on the hotel guests. Sixty of the hotel rooms had concealed espionage devices, and even some of the tables in the restaurant had microphones. The KGB left the hotel in a hurry right before the independence of Estonia in August 1991, but the secret rooms were not found until 1994. The former radio centre is now a museum.

In 2003, the hotel was sold to the S Group, a Finnish retailing cooperative organisation. It now has 516 rooms.

Further reading
 Nupponen, Sakari: Aikamatka hotelli Viruun. Ajatuskirjat, 2007. .

References

External links
 Official site

Hotels in Tallinn
Hotels established in 1972
Hotel buildings completed in 1972
1972 establishments in Estonia
Hotels built in the Soviet Union
Kesklinn, Tallinn